Chemical classification systems attempt to classify elements or compounds according to certain chemical functional or structural properties. Whereas the structural properties are largely intrinsic, functional properties and the derived classifications depend to a certain degree on the type of chemical interaction partners on which the function is exerted. Sometimes other criteria like purely physical ones (e.g. molecular weight) or - on the other hand - functional properties above the chemical level are also used for building chemical taxonomies.

Some systems mix the various levels, resulting in hierarchies where the domains are slightly confused, for example having structural and functional aspects end up on the same level. Whereas chemical function is closely dependent on chemical structure, the situation becomes more involved when e.g. pharmacological function is integrated, because the QSAR can usually not be directly computed from structural qualities.

Physico-chemical classification 
 by molecular weight
 by electrical charge: uncharged, positively, negatively, partially charged
 formal charge, oxidation state
 solubility
 pH value

Functional classification

Chemical function 
 by functional group

Pharmacological/biological function 

Mostly appropriate only for large biological molecules (as at least one interacting partner), in particular enzymes, depends on chemical functions of their constituent amino acids.

 ligand vs. receptor, coenzyme
 EC number
 TC number
 pharmacophore vs. non-drug

Mixed systems 
 Anatomical Therapeutic Chemical Classification System
 Gene Ontology

See also
Globally Harmonized System of Classification and Labelling of Chemicals
Chemical Entities of Biological Interest

External links

 
classification